Denmark are competing in the 2014 European Athletics Championships in Zürich, Switzerland. Sixteen athletes were selected for the championships, making it the biggest team since the 2002 championships.

Men

Track and road

 Q
 Qualified by heat position
 DNQ
 Did not qualify
 SB
 Season best

Women

Track and road

PB
Personal best
DQ
Disqualified
Petersen was disqualified for a false start in her heat
DNQ
Did not qualify
q
Qualified by time

Field

DNQ
Did not qualify

References

External links

Nations at the 2014 European Athletics Championships
2014
European Athletics Championships